1 Camelopardalis (1 Cam) is a double star system in the constellation Camelopardalis.

The 1 Camelopardalis system is part of the Camelopardalis OB1 stellar association, which is 820 pc away.  1 Camelopardalis A is a hot massive star which has evolved away from the main sequence to become a giant.  1 Camelopardalis B is 10" away and is probably an early B class subgiant.

There is an 11th magnitude star 150" away.  It has been considered to be a member of a triple system, but Gaia observations show it to be an unrelated background object.

1 Camelopardalis A is a variable star with a small amplitude. It has a likely period of 0.22132 days and is thought to be a β Cephei variable or slowly pulsating B-type star. Hipparcos photometry shows an amplitude of 0.035 magnitudes.

References

Camelopardalis (constellation)
O-type bright giants
Camelopardalis, 01
1417
028446
Camelopardalis, DL
B-type subgiants
Beta Cephei variables
021148
BD+53 0779
Binary stars